Ochromolopis ictella is a moth of the family Epermeniidae. It is found from Finland to the Iberian Peninsula, Italy and Greece and from France to Ukraine. It is also found in North Africa.

The wingspan is 11–13 mm.

The larvae feed on Thesium species, including Thesium bavarum. They initially mine the leaves of their host plant. The mine has the form of a short, full depth, irregular, linear mine. A single larva may make several mines. Older larvae live freely on the plant under some spinning. Larvae are greenish with a pale brown head.

References

Moths described in 1813
Epermeniidae
Moths of Europe
Moths of Asia
Moths of Africa